Eivere is a village in Paide Parish, Järva County in northern-central Estonia.

Linguist Elmar Muuk (1901–1941) was born in Eivere.

Eivere manor

Eivere estate was first mentioned in 1552. The current manor house was built around 1912 in an eclectic style, mixing neo-Gothic and Art Nouveau elements.

References

External links
Eivere manor at Estonian Manors Portal

Villages in Järva County
Manor houses in Estonia
Kreis Jerwen